Odontocline is a genus of Jamaican flowering plants in the daisy family.

 Species
All the species are native to Jamaica.
 Odontocline dolichantha (Krug & Urb.) B.Nord.
 Odontocline fadyenii (Griseb.) B.Nord. 
 Odontocline glabra (Sw.) B.Nord. 
 Odontocline hollickii (Britton ex Greenm.) B.Nord. 
 Odontocline laciniata (Sw.) B.Nord. 
 Odontocline tercentenariae (Proctor) B.Nord.

References

Flora of Jamaica
Senecioneae
Asteraceae genera